Abronius Silo (fl. 1st century BC) was a Latin poet who lived in the latter part of the Augustan age.  He was a pupil of the rhetorician Marcus Porcius Latro.  His son was also a poet, but he was not respected because he wrote plays for pantomimes. Only two hexameters of his work survive today. During his life he would face a charge of plagiarism. Although Silo believed he was simply inspired by his teacher.

References

Ancient Roman poets
Golden Age Latin writers
1st-century BC poets
Latin writers known only from secondary sources